Toy Love is a 2002 New Zealand drama film written and directed by Harry Sinclair and features Dean O'Gorman, Kate Elliott, Marissa Stott, Michael Lawrence, Genevieve McClean, Chris Dykzeul, Peter Feeney, Quinton Hita, Miriama Smith, Kim Michalis, Rose McIver and Lynette Forday.

Plot
Love is a game for Ben who lies and cheats on his girlfriend Emily, with the greatest of ease. But when he meets the sexy and unpredictable Chlo, the tables are turned. Ben falls head over heels in love, and is astonished to find someone even more immoral than he is.

Cast

Awards
Festival Internacional de Cinema do Porto 2003
Won – Audience Jury Award – Harry Sinclair

Gijón International Film Festival 2002
Nominated – Best Feature (Grand Prix Asturias) – Harry Sinclair

New Zealand Film and TV Awards 2003
Nominated – Best Actress – Kate Elliott
Nominated – Best Contribution to a Soundtrack – Tim Prebble
Nominated – Best Editing – Margot Francis
Nominated – Best Original Music – Victoria Kelly, Joost Langeveld

See also
Cinema of New Zealand

References

External links
 Toy Love at IMDB

2002 films
2002 drama films
2000s New Zealand films
2000s English-language films
Films directed by Harry Sinclair
New Zealand drama films